The following article details examples of the game show Family Feud, originally aired in the United States on ABC and CBS and in syndication, elsewhere in the world. Most international versions are produced by Fremantle (who currently owns rights to formats developed by Mark Goodson Productions).

International versions
 Airing
 Not airing
 Upcoming

See also
List of television show franchises

References

External links

 Family Feud format sales promo from Fremantle International Distribution
 Official site for Familetna (Algerian version) on Canal Algerie
 Official site for 100 Argentinos Dicen (Argentinian version) on Canal 13
 Official site for Bert's Family Feud (1st generation) on Nine Network
 Official site for Bert's Family Feud (2nd generation) on Nine Network
 Official site for Family Feud on Network Ten
 Official sub site for the 2014 Australian revival of Family Feud on Network Ten
 Official site for All Star Family Feud on Network Ten
 Official website for Family Feud (Brazilian version) on SBT (via Internet Archive)
 Official Website for Familieraad(2005 version) on vtm
 Official site for Familieraad (2014 version) on vtm
 site for Ceмeйни войни (Semeĭni Vοĭni/Family Wars/Bulgarian version) (via internet archive)
 Official site for Cемейни войни (2016) (Semeіnі Ѵоіni (2016)/Family Wars (2016)/Bulgarian version on Nova TV
 Official website for Family Feud China on Sohu
 Official application site for Pet na Pet (Croatian version) on RTL Televizija
 Official website for Pet na Pet on RTL Televizija
 Official site for Kontra Plakes (Cyprus version) on Sigma TV
 Official site for 5 Proti 5 (Czech Republic/Novotný version) on Prima
 Official website for Chung Sức 
 Official website for Suur Lotokolmapӓev - Rooside Sṏda on Kanal2
 Official website for 100 Mexicanos Dijeron (via Internet Archive)
 Official website for 100 Mexicanos Dijeron V.I.P Edition (via Internet Archive)
 Official website for 100 Mexicanos Dijeron (Televisa site) (via Internet Archive)
 Official website for ¿Que Dice La Gente? on TeleFutura (via Internet Archive)
 Official website for Qué Dice la Gente on Venevision (via Internet Archive)
 Official website for 100 Colombianos Dicen (via Internet Archive)
 Official website for 100 Panamenős Dicen (via Internet Archive)
 Official website for 100 Latinos Dijeron on MundoFOX (Spanish-language USA)
 Official video site for 100 Latinos Dijeon on MundoFOX (Spanish-language USA)
 Official website for 100 Latinos Dijeron on Telerama (Spanish-language)
 Official website for Familieraad (Belgian version) on VTM
 Official website for Une Famille en or (French version) on TF1
 Official website for Family Battle (French version) on C8
 Official website for Familien-Duell on RTL
 Official website for Familien-Duell Prominenten-Special (German version) on RTL
 Original Famili 100 (Part 1) @ Pearson's Official site (via internet archive)
 Original Famili 100 (Part 2) @ Pearson's Official site (via internet archive)
 Official website for New Famili 100 (Indonesian version) on (Indosiar)
 Official website for Family Fortunes (Ireland version) on tv3 (via Internet Archive)
 description of Une Famille en or (French version) on TF1
 description of C'est Beau La Vie (French) on the defunct La Cinq
 Familien Duell 1992-2003 original (German version) on RTL
 original website for "Familien Duell" (German version) on RTL
 Official website for "Familien Duell" (2016 German version) on RTL Plus
  5-gegen-5 2006 short-lived remake (German version) on RTL II
 original website for "5 gegen 5" (German version) on RTL II
 Official website for Akou ti Eipan (Greek version) on Alpha TV
 Official website of 4N4LN: Négyen négy ellen - A családi játszma (Hungarian version) on RTL Klub
 Official Site for I Heard 100 People Quiz (Japanese version) on TBS (via Internet Archive)
 Official website of 100 De Moldoveni Au Zis (Moldova version) on Prime
 Official Website of Family Feud (New Zealand version) on TV3
 Official website of 100 Peruanos Dicen (Peru version) on América Televisión
 Official website of Family Feud (Philippines version) on ABS-CBN
 Official website of Family Feud (Philippines version) on GMA Network
 Official website for Familiada (Polish version) on tvp
 Official Website for FamiliaDA (Romanian version) on Antena 1
 Official site for Ce Spun Românii (Romanian version) on Pro TV
 Official website for Cто κ οдʜοмy (Russian version on RTR
 Official site for Porodincni Obracun (Serbian version)
 Official site for 100 ljudi, 100 ćudi (Serbian version)
 5gegen5 2005 (Swiss version)
 Official website for ΠPOCTO шоy (Ukrainian version) on 1+1
 Official website for 4 of 4 Family Game (2001-06 Thailand version) on Thaitv3
 Official website of 4 of 4 Family Game (2016 Thailand version) on ONE HD
 Supporting website for Aileler Yarişiyor (Turkish version) on TRT 1
 Official website for Aileler Yarişiyor (Turkish version) on TRT 1
 Official Website for Aileler Yarişiyor (Turkish version) on TRT 1
 Official Website for Aileler Yarişiyor (Turkish version) on TV8
 Official Website for 100 Kişiye Sorduk (Turkish version) on TV8
 Official website for Porodični Obračun (Serbia version) on RTV Pink
 Official website for 5 proti 5 (Slovakian version) on Jednotka
 Official website for 5 proti 5 (2011 Slovakian version) on Jednotka
 Družinski Dvoboj - Slovenia
 Official website for Kdo bo Koga? (Slovenian version) on Planet TV 
 Official website for Ahla Aile (United Arab Emirates version) on Abu Dhabi TV
 Info about Bitva Umov (Battle of Wits) @ Khabar (Kazakh version)
 Trailer for 100 Tarberak (Armenian version) on H1

 
Television lists by series
F